General  was the Chairman of the Joint Staff Council of the Japan Self-Defense Forces. A lifelong career military officer, he began as an infantry officer. He was named Chief-of-Staff of the Ground Self-Defense Force in July 1997, and became Chairman of the Joint Staff Council in March 1999, his term ending in March 2001.

External links 

Chiefs of Staff of the Japan Ground Self-Defense Force
Military personnel from Hyōgo Prefecture
1941 births
Living people
National Defense Academy of Japan alumni